William J. Luti served as Special Assistant to the President and Senior Director for Defense Policy and Strategy for the National Security Council in the administration of President George W. Bush.

Previously, Luti served as the Deputy Under Secretary of Defense for Near Eastern and South Asian Affairs. Prior to joining the Defense Department, Dr. Luti served as a Special Advisor for National Security Affairs to Vice President Cheney. He is a retired Captain in the U.S. Navy, having previously served for 26 years as a naval officer and naval aviator in a wide variety of operational and policy positions, including command of an aviation squadron, an amphibious assault ship, and an amphibious readiness group.

Luti received his bachelor's degree from The Citadel, a master's degree from the U.S. Naval War College, and a masters in law and diplomacy and a PhD in international relations from Tufts University's Fletcher School of Law and Diplomacy.

William J. Luti participated in all four conferences of the Bilderberg Group between 2004 and 2007.

He is Vice President for Strategic Implementation of the Hudson Institute, one of the leading conservative think tanks in the USA.

See also
Karen Kwiatkowski

References

External links
 White House archives

United States Department of Defense officials
Living people
Year of birth missing (living people)
The Citadel, The Military College of South Carolina alumni
United States Navy officers
United States Naval Aviators